Harald Wiberg (1 March 1908 – 15 August 1986) was a Swedish writer, artist and illustrator. He was best known for his illustrations in the books about Tomten and of Astrid Lindgren.

Life and career 
Wiberg was born in Ankarsrum in 1908. He attended the Stockholm College of Drama (Stockholms dramatiska högskola). Later he also studied in France and Italy. Most of his illustrations show Scandinavian landscapes, animals and traditional mythological figures. In the 1960s, he became known in Sweden through his appearances in the nature documentary show Korsnäsgårde. He became known internationally through his illustrations of the Tomten books: Tomten (1961) and Tomten and the Fox (1965). In the Swedish edition of these works, Wiberg's illustrations were published next to the original poems by Viktor Rydberg and Karl-Erik Forsslund. In the international editions the illustration appeared next to a text written by Astrid Lindgren, based on the poems and the illustrations. The success of these works prompted Wiberg to write and illustrate his own Tomten book entitled Gammaldags jul. The book was translated into English (Christmas at the tomten's farm). Another work by Viktor Rydberg, Björn's Advent on Christmas Eve (Lille Viggs äventyr på julafton, 1980) was also illustrated by Wiberg. In 1976 he received the Elsa Beskow badge for his illustrations in the book The big snowstorm (Den stora snöstuellen, 1975). On August 15, 1986, he died in Falköping.

Works (selection)

Awards 
 1970: Lewis Carroll Shelf Award for Christmas in the Stable (shared with Astrid Lindgren)
 1973: The Brooklyn Art Books For Children Citations for Christmas in the Stable (shared with Astrid Lindgren)
 1976: Elsa Beskow-plaketten for The big snowstorm

References 

1908 births
1986 deaths
Swedish fantasy illustrators
Swedish male writers